Lovechild are a rock and indie band from Belfast, Northern Ireland.  They first rose to prominence in 2003 with their first two singles "Hope You Have a Lovely Day", and "The Siren". Regular gigs at Belfast venues such as The Empire, Mandela Hall, The Rosetta as well as festivals like Glasgowbury, saw them build their following.

Band members
 David McClean - Vocals, Guitar
 Luke Mathers - Lead Guitar
 Lewis Woods - Bass
 Rodger Firmin - Drums

Early exposure
The band gained notoriety when "Hope You Have A Lovely Day" was chosen as part of a North American ad campaign by VisitBritain.ca in order to increase tourism to the United Kingdom.  The song was featured on the accompanying album Visit Britain Rocks, released on EMI.  Following this, their songs found their way onto many soundtracks including for the adventure documentary series "This Is The Sea" by filmmaker Justine Curgenven, which played on National Geographic Channel, Sky, and BBC television.  Volume One featured "Hope You Have A Lovely Day" and "The Siren", while Volume Two featured "Killin' Me". Both received DVD release. They won the Belfast Empire heat of GBOB in winter 2004, and toured continuously over the following months. The Friendly Fire EP gained favourable press reviews in publications such as Logo Magazine, Juxta Fanzine, Big List and The Fly UK Gig Guide.

Discography
The Siren (CD single) (2003)
The Friendly Fire EP (CD & Digital release) (2004)

References
 Visit Britain Campaign 
 Lovechild @ Mandela Hall, Belfast. 
 "This Is The Sea: One" 
 "This Is The Sea: Two" Documentary on BBC, National Geographic Channel
 Front Page Vol:2 MusicBest Records

Footnotes

External links
 LastFm.com - Friendly Fire EP 
 Lovechild on Myspace

Indie rock groups from Northern Ireland
Musical groups from Belfast